Shri Chhatrapati Shivajiraje College of Engineering is an engineering college located on the Pune-Satara Highway, Pune, India. It was established in 2009 by former Education Minister Hon. Mr. Anantrao Thopte.

History
The Shri Chhatrapati Shivajiraje College of Engineering was established in 2009, by Rajgad Dnyanpeeth. Rajgad Dnyanpeeth was established in 1972, by Hon. Anantraoji Thopte with a wider objective of bringing about intellectual awakening and transformation in educational, economic, cultural and social fields, in Maharashtra (India).

Departments 
 Civil Engineering  (2009)
 Electronics and Telecommunication Engineering (2009)
 Computer Engineering (2009)
 Mechanical Engineering (2009)

Description

The Institute has four academic departments.
The Mechanical engineering department and workshops were established in 2009. The department also contains the classrooms for first-year undergraduate degree courses. The department has facilities in Metallurgy, Dynamics, Refrigeration and Air conditioning, Automobile, Heat Engines, Robotics and Automation, CAD/CAM/CAE, Mechanical Measurements and Fluid Mechanics, and workshops in machine, smithy, carpentry, filing, and welding. All laboratories have testing facilities.

The other three departments are Civil engineering, Electronics and Telecommunications engineering, and Computer engineering. The Computer Engineering Department offers a bachelor's degree in Computer Engineering.

Admission 
Admission criteria are based on the Maharashtra CET( 85%) and AIEEE (15%) rankings.

College fest

"Mudra" is the cultural festival held every year in the college. In the recent years, it has witnessed participation from many educational institutions of Pune. Celebrities like actress Bhargavi Chirmule have increased the glory of the festivals of the institute. Mudra also has many events like seminars, debates, quizzes, outdoor games and fun events. "Rajgad Karandak" a state level dance competition enhances the prestige of cultural festival. Many colleges had participated in this event and conquered their positions every year.

"Nirmal Techfest" is a technical festival initiated in the year 2013, in which there are events like robowar, Robo race, contraption, circuit design, town planning, LAN gamings and many more techno fun based events. Many colleges had shown a keen interest in this event as always.

Campus 
There are some tourist attractions like Purander fort and Balaji Temple near the college. The college has hostels provided for the students and promised a wifi connection to be made available in time. The hostels have a common TV room, a reading room facilities.

Student associations
Society of Automotive Engineers (SAE), India  (2013)
Mechanical Engineering Students Association (MESA)
Association of Computer Engineers (ACE)

References

External links 

Universities and colleges in Pune
Engineering colleges in Maharashtra
Monuments and memorials to Shivaji
Educational institutions established in 2009
2009 establishments in Maharashtra